Johan von Koskull (25 September 1964 – 29 May 2021) was a Finnish sailor. He competed at the 1984 Summer Olympics and the 1988 Summer Olympics.

References

External links
 

1964 births
2021 deaths
Finnish male sailors (sport)
Olympic sailors of Finland
Sailors at the 1984 Summer Olympics – 470
Sailors at the 1988 Summer Olympics – 470
Sportspeople from Helsinki